Middle Sound is a bay in New Hanover County, North Carolina, in the United States.

Middle Sound was named for its central location between two other sounds.

References

Bodies of water of New Hanover County, North Carolina
Bays of North Carolina